Kevin Jordan (born December 31, 1970) is a retired American mixed martial artist. A professional competitor from 2000 until 2010, he competed for the UFC and Strikeforce.



Mixed martial arts record

|-
|Loss
|align=center|11-9
|Branden Lee Hinkle
|TKO (punches)
|DFL 1: The Big Bang
|
|align=center|1
|align=center|2:30
|Atlantic City, New Jersey, United States
|
|-
|Loss
|align=center|11-8
|Ray Sefo 
|TKO (injury)
|Strikeforce Challengers: Kennedy vs. Cummings
|
|align=center|2
|align=center|0:24
|Bixby, Oklahoma, United States
|
|-
|Win
|align=center|11-7
|Patrick Smith
|Decision (unanimous)
|American Steel Cagefighting
|
|align=center|3
|align=center|5:00
|Salem, New Hampshire, United States
|
|-
|Loss
|align=center|10-7
|Joel Wyatt
|Decision (split)
|RIE: Battle at the Burg 1
|
|align=center|3
|align=center|5:00
|Harrisonburg, Virginia, United States
|Return to Heavyweight.
|-
|Loss
|align=center|10-6
|Marcos Santa Cruz
|Decision (unanimous)
|FFP: Untamed 22
|
|align=center|3
|align=center|5:00
|Plymouth, Massachusetts, United States
|Super Heavyweight debut.
|-
|Win
|align=center|10-5
|Carlos Moreno
|TKO (submission to strikes)
|BCX 3: Battle Cage Xtreme 3
|
|align=center|3
|align=center|2:04
|Atlantic City, New Jersey, United States
|
|-
|Win
|align=center|9-5
|Chris Herring
|TKO (submission to strikes)
|Wild Bill's: Fight Night 6
|
|align=center|1
|align=center|1:19
|Duluth, Georgia, United States
|
|-
|Loss
|align=center|8-5
|Josh Diekmann
|TKO (injury)
|FFP: Untamed 3
|
|align=center|1
|align=center|0:10
|Brockton, Massachusetts, United States
|
|-
|Loss
|align=center|8-4
|Gabriel Gonzaga
|KO (punch)
|UFC 56
|
|align=center|3
|align=center|4:39
|Las Vegas, Nevada, United States
|
|-
|Loss
|align=center|8-3
|Paul Buentello
|Submission (neck crank)
|UFC 53
|
|align=center|1
|align=center|4:00
|Atlantic City, New Jersey, United States
|
|-
|Win
|align=center|8-2
|John Dixon
|Decision (unanimous)
|FFC 13: Freestyle Fighting Championships 13
|
|align=center|3
|align=center|5:00
|Biloxi, Mississippi, United States
|
|-
|Win
|align=center|7-2
|Eric Loveless
|Decision
|FFC 11: Explosion
|
|align=center|N/A
|
|Biloxi, Mississippi, United States
|
|-
|Win
|align=center|6-2
|Kerry Schall
|Submission (rear-naked choke)
|XFO 2: New Blood
|
|align=center|1
|align=center|2:06
|Fontana, Wisconsin, United States
|
|-
|Win
|align=center|5-2
|Chris Seifert
|TKO
|FFC 8: Freestyle Fighting Championships 8
|
|align=center|2
|align=center|0:55
|Biloxi, Mississippi, United States
|
|-
|Win
|align=center|4-2
|Jayme Mckinney
|Submission (armbar)
|XFC 1: Xtreme Fight Club 1
|
|align=center|1
|
|Morgan City, Louisiana, United States
|
|-
|Win
|align=center|3-2
|Sam Holloway
|TKO
|ICB: International Cage Brawl
|
|align=center|1
|
|Birmingham, Alabama, United States
|
|-
|Win
|align=center|2-2
|Sean Sallee
|Decision (majority)
|Tennessee Shooto: Conquest
|
|align=center|2
|align=center|5:00
|Clarksville, Tennessee, United States
|
|-
|Loss
|align=center|1-2
|Travis Wiuff
|Decision
|UW: Ultimate Wrestling
|
|align=center|3
|
|Minneapolis, Minnesota, United States
|
|-
|Loss
|align=center|1-1
|Wesley Correira
|KO (punches)
|SB 24: Return of the Heavyweights 1
|
|align=center|1
|align=center|4:28
|Honolulu, United States
|
|-
|Win
|align=center|1-0
|Kelly Williams
|TKO
|BB 9: Fights, Bikes, & Babes
|
|align=center|1
|align=center|0:00
|Gainesville, Georgia, United States
|
|-

References

External links
 
 

1970 births
Living people
Sportspeople from Columbus, Georgia
American male mixed martial artists
Mixed martial artists from Georgia (U.S. state)
Heavyweight mixed martial artists
Ultimate Fighting Championship male fighters
People from Fairfield, California